Haitham Ali Mohamad Al Haj Ali Zein (born 6 January 1979), or simply Haitham Zein, is a Lebanese former footballer who played as a forward. He played for numerous Lebanese Premier League clubs, mainly at Tadamon Sour, and represented Lebanon internationally.

Early life 
Zein was born in Iraq to parents from Borj Ech Chemali, Lebanon; he began playing football aged 11 in the streets of the Al-Anbar Governorate. He then moved to Lebanon with his family due to the Gulf War.

Club career

Tadamon Sour 
Zein signed for Tadamon Sour's youth team in 1994. He made his senior debut in 1995, coming on as an 80th-minute substitute against Bourj at the Saida Municipal Stadium; trailing 2–1, Zein scored a goal and assisted two, helping his side overturn the result to 4–2. He played with Tadamon until 2005, scoring 94 league goals.

Nejmeh 
On 9 November 2005, Zein moved to Nejmeh, spending half a season. He described his short experience at Nejmeh as negative.

Bahrain SC 
He moved abroad to Bahrain SC in 2006.

Return to Lebanon 
He returned to Lebanon in 2008, signing for Chabab Ghazieh, before moving to Islah Borj Shmali the following season. Zein was among the league top scorers in the 2010–11 Lebanese Premier League, scoring eight goals. In October 2011, he signed for Salam Sour, retiring that season.

Zein scored 113 goals in the Lebanese Premier League – 138 considering his goals scored in the cancelled 2000–01 season.

International career 
In 2002, Zein played for the Lebanon Olympic team at the 2002 Asian Games, scoring a goal in an 11–0 win against Afghanistan. He played for the senior team between 1998 and 2004. He played 50 international matches, scoring 17 goals.

Managerial career 
Between 2016 and 2017, Zein was part of the technical staff of his former club Islah Borj Shmali.

Personal life 
Zein's nephew, Mahdi Zein, also plays football.

Honours
Tadamon Sour
 Lebanese FA Cup: 2000–01

Individual
 Lebanese Premier League top scorer: 1998–99, 2000–01
 Lebanese Premier League Team of the Season: 1998–99

See also
 List of Lebanon international footballers
 List of Lebanon international footballers born outside Lebanon
 List of association football families

References

External links
 
 Haitham Zein at RSSSF
 
 

1979 births
Living people
People from Fallujah
Lebanese footballers
Association football forwards
Tadamon Sour SC players
Nejmeh SC players
Bahrain SC players
Chabab Ghazieh SC players
Islah Borj Al Shmali Club players
Salam Sour SC players
Lebanese Premier League players
Bahraini Premier League players
Lebanon youth international footballers
Lebanon international footballers
Asian Games competitors for Lebanon
Footballers at the 1998 Asian Games
Footballers at the 2002 Asian Games
2000 AFC Asian Cup players
Lebanese expatriate footballers
Lebanese expatriate sportspeople in Bahrain
Expatriate footballers in Bahrain
Lebanese Premier League top scorers